Angus Edward Redmond (11 November 1912 – 6 November 1978) was a New Zealand athlete and billiards player.  He won six consecutive national discus throw titles and represented his country in that event at the 1950 British Empire Games. Later, he represented New Zealand at the World Amateur Billiards Championship in 1964.

Early life and family
Born on 11 November 1912, Redmond was the son of Harry O'Neil Redmond and Rebecca Redmond (née Tait). During World War II, he saw active service in North Africa with the 2nd New Zealand Expeditionary Force, serving as a driver in the New Zealand Army Service Corps.

Sporting career

Athletics
A discus thrower, Redmond won the New Zealand national discus throw title in six consecutive years from 1946 to 1951. He retired from the sport three years later.

Billiards
Redmond represented New Zealand at the World Amateur Billiards Championship held in Pukekohe in 1964, finishing in eighth place, and second-best New Zealander.

Personal life
Redmond was married to Elizabeth Hamilton (Betty) Fitch, and the couple had three children. Gus Redmond died from cancer in Auckland on 6 November 1978, and was buried at Taruheru Cemetery in Gisborne. Betty Redmond died in 2010.

References

1912 births
1978 deaths
New Zealand military personnel of World War II
Commonwealth Games competitors for New Zealand
Athletes (track and field) at the 1950 British Empire Games
New Zealand male discus throwers
New Zealand players of English billiards
Deaths from cancer in New Zealand
Burials at Taruheru Cemetery